Helga Liselott "Lottie" Tham (born 18 April 1949) is a Swedish heiress and businesswoman, owner of over 5% of the fashion retail chain H&M.

Early life
She was born Helga Liselott Persson, the daughter of Erling Persson, the founder of H&M.

Career
Tham is the second largest shareholder in H&M and holds 5.32% of the shares; her brother Stefan Persson has 37.69%.

According to Forbes, Tham has a net worth of $2.1 billion, as of May 2020.

Personal life
She is married to Swedish financial journalist and financier Pieter Tham; they live in Stockholm, Sweden, and have one son and a daughter.

References 

1949 births
Living people
20th-century Swedish businesswomen
20th-century Swedish businesspeople
Swedish billionaires
21st-century Swedish businesswomen
21st-century Swedish businesspeople
Persson family
Tham family